Trinity Episcopal Church is an Episcopal congregation and a historic wooden Gothic Revival style building in Bend, Oregon, United States. It is listed on the National Register of Historic Places.

See also
National Register of Historic Places listings in Deschutes County, Oregon

References

External links
Trinity Episcopal Church (official website)

Episcopal churches in Oregon
National Register of Historic Places in Bend, Oregon
Churches on the National Register of Historic Places in Oregon
Carpenter Gothic church buildings in Oregon
Culture of Bend, Oregon
1929 establishments in Oregon
Historic district contributing properties in Oregon